Anosibe-An'ala is a district of Alaotra-Mangoro in Madagascar.

References 

Districts of Alaotra-Mangoro